The National Theater and National Concert Hall are twin performing arts venues at Liberty Square in Zhongzheng District, Taipei, Taiwan. Completed in 1987, the landmarks stand on the south and north sides of the square with Chiang Kai-shek Memorial Hall to the east. Together the venues are referred to by the abbreviation NTCH. The square itself sits near Ketagalan Boulevard, site of the Presidential Office Building, the National Central Library, the National Taiwan Museum, and the 228 Peace Memorial Park.

History 

Taiwan's National Theater and National Concert Hall are two of the first major modern performing arts facilities to be established in Asia. Upon the death of Chiang Kai-shek in 1975, the Kuomintang government authorized the construction of a monument and cultural arts facilities on the grounds of a memorial plaza. The project cost TWD 7.4 billion.

Yang Cho-cheng and Architects and Engineers Associates were responsible for the overall design. The buildings, though modern in function and purpose, recall traditional elements of Chinese palace architecture. The G+H Company of Germany and Philips, based in The Netherlands, played leading roles in the design of the interior facilities, stage lighting and acoustics. Six directors oversaw the project from initial planning sessions to final completion: Jou Tsuo-Min, Chang Chih-liang, Hu Yao-heng, Li Yen and Chu Tzung-ching. The structures were completed on 20 September 1987, and officially opened their doors the following month as venues of the “National Chiang Kai-shek Cultural Center”. Vice President Lee Teng-hui and Premier Yu Kuo-hua presided over the opening ceremonies for the two buildings on 31 October 1987.

Mass democracy rallies at the Liberty Square in 1990 launched Taiwanese society on a quick but peaceful transition from one-party authoritarian rule to pluralistic democracy. In 1999, the Ministry of Education under the administration of Lee Teng-Hui, Taiwan's first elected president, consolidated the governing bodies of the National Theater and Concert Hall with those of the National Symphony Orchestra, National Chinese Orchestra and National Chorus. In 2004 this larger organization became an autonomous executive body, the National CKS Cultural Center, headed by an artistic director reporting to a board of directors.

Each structure can host at least two events simultaneously. The National Theater contains a smaller Experimental Theater and the National Concert Hall holds a more intimate Recital Hall. Outdoor performances can be staged simultaneously on the square. The pipe organ by Flentrop Orgelbouw in the National Concert Hall was the largest organ in Asia at the time of its installation in 1987. Both structures house art galleries, libraries, shops, and restaurants. The National Theater houses a Performing Arts Library and publication offices for Taiwan's Performing Arts Review.

National Theater and Concert Hall, like all performing arts venues in capital cities, play diplomatic as well as artistic roles. Guests regularly include top elected leaders in Taiwan as well as international artists and dignitaries. Visitors over the years have included Margaret Thatcher of the UK, Mikhail Gorbachev of the USSR, Lee Kuan Yew of Singapore, Rafael Calderón Muñoz of Costa Rica and former First Lady Betty Ford of the U.S.

Artistic Life 

The National Theater and Concert Hall host a constant stream of events by local and international artists each year.

Performers who have appeared in the National Theater include the Cloud Gate Dance Theater, The Kirov Ballet, the Suzuki Company of Toga and its director Tadashi Suzuki, Yang Li-hua Taiwanese Opera, the Ming Hwa Yuan Theater Troupe, the Fei Ma Yu Opera Troupe and Pili Heroes, kabuki performer Bandō Tamasaburō V, stage director Robert Wilson, and dancers Martha Graham, Merce Cunningham, Rudolph Nureyev, Pina Bausch, Trisha Brown, Liu Feng-hsueh, Lin Hwai-min, Lo Man-fei, Yu Hao-yen and Liu Shao-lu.

International performers in the National Concert Hall have included composers Philip Glass and Samuel Adler and Fredrick Ernest, sopranos Jessye Norman, Barbara Hendricks and Mirella Freni, tenors Plácido Domingo, José Carreras and Luciano Pavarotti, baritone Bryn Terfel, violinists Pinchas Zukerman, Hilary Hahn and Akiko Suwanai, cellists Mstislav Rostropovich and Yo-Yo Ma, pianists Nobuyuki Tsujii, Ruth Slenczynska, Tatiana Nikolayeva, Fou Ts'ong and Vladimir Ashkenazy, conductors Simon Rattle, Günther Herbig, Mei-Ann Chen, Sergiu Celibidache, Michael Tilson Thomas, Apo Hsu, Helmuth Rilling and Lorin Maazel.

American virtuoso organist John Walker has frequently performed at the Concert Hall, beginning in 1992. Since then, he has played both as soloist and with various orchestras, including Taiwan's National Symphony Orchestra.

Ensembles appearing at the Hall include the Juilliard String Quartet, the Royal Concertgebouw Orchestra of Amsterdam, the Vienna Philharmonic Orchestra, the Czech Philharmonic, the Berlin Philharmonic Orchestra, the Munich Philharmonic Orchestra, the Bavarian Radio Symphony Orchestra, the San Francisco Symphony Orchestra, the Shanghai Symphony Orchestra and the Vienna Boys Choir. Concerts by visiting orchestras are often broadcast to overflow crowds numbering in the thousands who fill the Square. Professional Taiwanese ensembles that regularly appear in the hall include the National Symphony Orchestra, the Taipei Symphony Orchestra, the National Taiwan Symphony Orchestra, the Evergreen Symphony Orchestra, the Taipei Chinese Orchestra, the Taiwan National Choir, the Formosa Singers, and the Taipei Philharmonic Orchestra and Chorus.

Artistic styles and traditions from across the world are represented in the halls' events, including kabuki theater, Shakespearean drama, Taiwanese opera and puppet drama, Verdi opera, African dance, Beijing opera, Broadway shows, Wagnerian music drama, American jazz, Parisian comic opera, and Latin dance. Both venues are the site of a variety of festivals and special events, including the Taipei International Arts Festival, a series of International Arts Festivals ("Call Out in Ecstacy", "Poetic Essays with Lively Meanings"), the British Theatre Festival, the Chinese Drama Festival, and the Taipei Film Festival. The buildings regularly provide a backdrop to outdoor events on Liberty Square, including visits to Taiwan by foreign leaders and the annual Taipei Lantern Festival.

The Classic 20 festival in 2007-2008 commemorated the twentieth anniversary of the halls. The festival season featured visits by Tadashi Suzuki, Philip Glass, Robert Wilson, the Bavarian Radio Symphony Orchestra and the Deutsche Oper am Rhein as well as the Cloud Gate Dance Theater, Yang Li-hua Taiwanese Opera, Performance Workshop Theater and New-Classic Dance Company.

Nomenclature 
The standard abbreviation NTCH (National Theater and Concert Hall) refers to the Cultural Center in its entirety. NCH (National Concert Hall) refers to the concert hall alone.

See also
 National Kaohsiung Center for the Arts
 National Taichung Theater

References

External links 

 
Taiwan Yearbook: Culture
Specification of the Flentrop organ

Buildings and structures completed in 1987
1987 establishments in Taiwan
Theatres completed in 1987
Culture in Taipei
Buildings and structures in Taipei
Tourist attractions in Taipei
Theatres in Taiwan
Concert halls in Taiwan
Taiwan
Music venues completed in 1987
Opera houses in Taiwan